Rodney Lee Brewer (born February 24, 1966) is a former American college and professional baseball player who was a first baseman and outfielder for the St. Louis Cardinals of Major League Baseball (MLB) from  to .

Brewer was born in Eustis, Florida.  He attended Apopka High School in Apopka, Florida, and played for the Apopka Blue Darters high school baseball team.

Brewer attended the University of Florida in Gainesville, Florida, where he played for coach Joe Arnold's Florida Gators baseball team from 1985 to 1987. In 1986, he played collegiate summer baseball with the Hyannis Mets of the Cape Cod Baseball League.

The St. Louis Cardinals selected Brewer in the fifth round of the 1987 MLB Draft.

Stats

See also 

 Florida Gators
 List of Florida Gators baseball players

References

External links

1948 births
Living people
All-American college baseball players
Baseball players from Florida
Florida Gators baseball players
Hyannis Harbor Hawks players
Major League Baseball first basemen
People from Eustis, Florida
St. Louis Cardinals players
Amarillo Dillas players
Abilene Prairie Dogs players
American expatriate baseball players in Mexico
Arkansas Travelers players
Buffalo Bisons (minor league) players
Charlotte Knights players
Guerreros de Oaxaca players
Johnson City Cardinals players
Louisville Redbirds players
Phoenix Firebirds players
Rojos del Águila de Veracruz players
Seibu Lions players
American expatriate baseball players in Japan
Springfield Cardinals players